Micragrotis lacteata is a species of moth of the family Noctuidae. It is found in Africa, including Kenya.

References 

Endemic moths of Kenya
Noctuinae
Moths of Africa
Moths described in 1903